Edgar Morgan (15 April 1882– April 1962) was a Welsh international rugby union forward who played club rugby for Swansea Rugby Football Club and the British Lions

Morgan made his Swansea debut in 1907 and played in the Swansea victories over both touring Australian (1908) and South African (1912) teams. He joined the British Army during World War I, and was later commissioned as an infantry officer before transferring to the Royal Engineers.

International career
Morgan gained his first international cap, when he was called up to play for Arthur Harding's Anglo-Welsh, British Lions team that toured New Zealand and Australia in 1908. It took a further six years until Morgan won his first Welsh cap against England at Twickenham on 17 January 1914. Morgan played all four home nation games that season and may have gained more caps but for the outbreak of the World War.

International matches played
 1914
 1914
 1914
 1914

Bibliography

References 

1882 births
1962 deaths
British & Irish Lions rugby union players from Wales
British Army personnel of World War I
Rugby union forwards
Swansea RFC players
Wales international rugby union players
Welsh rugby union players
Rugby union players from Pontardawe